The 1989 Hi-Tec British Open Championships was held at the Lambs Squash Club and the Wembley Conference Centre in London from 12–17 April 1989. Jahangir Khan won his eighth consecutive title defeating Rodney Martin in the final. This eighth win equalled the record previously set by Geoff Hunt of Australia.

Seeds

Draw and results

First round

Second round

Main draw

References

Men's British Open Squash Championships
Men's British Open
Men's British Open Squash Championship
Men's British Open Squash Championship
Men's British Open Squash Championship
Squash competitions in London